Succar is a common surname. Notable people with the surname include:

Middle name
Jean Succar Kuri (born 1944), Lebanese-born Mexican convicted businessman 

Surname / Family name
Alexander Succar (born 1995), Peruvian football (soccer) player
Tony Succar (born 1986), Peruvian–American musician, composer, arranger and producer

See also
Sukkar (disambiguation)